The Wildcat of Tucson is a 1940 American Western film directed by Lambert Hillyer and starring Bill Elliott as "Wild Bill" Hickok and Evelyn Young as Vivian Barlow.

The film was produced and released by Columbia Pictures. A feature film, its length is 59 minutes.

References

External links

1940 films
Columbia Pictures films
American Western (genre) films
1940 Western (genre) films
American black-and-white films
Cultural depictions of Wild Bill Hickok
Films directed by Lambert Hillyer
1940s American films